The Black Velvet Gown is a 1991 ITV television film, based on the 1984 novel by Catherine Cookson, and starring Janet McTeer, Geraldine Somerville, and Bob Peck. It won an International Emmy for Best Drama.

The film was produced by World Wide International Production for Tyne Tees Television.

Cast
 Janet McTeer as Riah Millican
 Geraldine Somerville as Biddy Millican
 Bob Peck as Percival Miller
 Brendan P. Healy as Tol Briston
 Jean Anderson as Madame Gallmington
 Christopher Benjamin as Anthony Gallmington
 Wendy Williams as Grace Gallmington
 David Hunt as Laurence Gallmington
 Jonathan Firth as Paul Gallmington
 Louise Lombard as Lucy Gallmington

References

External links

1991 television films
1991 films
Films based on British novels
Films scored by Carl Davis
ITV television dramas
Television series by ITV Studios
1991 drama films
International Emmy Award for Drama winners
Television shows set in County Durham
Television shows produced by Tyne Tees Television
1990s English-language films
1990s British films
British drama television films